Sam Maloney may refer to:

Samantha Maloney, musician known as Sam Maloney
Officer Sam Maloney, a fictional character of Radio Patrol (serial)

See also
Maloney (surname)
Sam Malone (disambiguation)